Alojzy Świderek (born 30 May 1952) is a Polish volleyball player. He competed in the men's tournament at the 1972 Summer Olympics.

References

External links
 

1952 births
Living people
Sportspeople from Łódź
Polish men's volleyball players
Olympic volleyball players of Poland
Volleyball players at the 1972 Summer Olympics
Resovia (volleyball) players
Legia Warsaw (volleyball) players